Annino may refer to:

Annino (Moscow Metro), a station of Moscow Metro, Moscow, Russia
Annino, Russia, name of several rural localities in Russia
Annino, alternative name of the former Gorelovo air base in Leningrad Oblast, Russia
Annino, former name of Şəmkir, Azerbaijan